Bothrotes canaliculatus is a species of darkling beetle in the family Tenebrionidae.

A subspecies of Bothrotes canaliculatus is B. canaliculatus acutus.

References

Further reading

 Arnett, R.H. Jr., M. C. Thomas, P. E. Skelley and J. H. Frank. (eds.). (2002). American Beetles, Volume II: Polyphaga: Scarabaeoidea through Curculionoidea. CRC Press LLC, Boca Raton, FL.
 
 Richard E. White. (1983). Peterson Field Guides: Beetles. Houghton Mifflin Company.

Pimeliinae